Sulaman is a state constituency in Sabah, Malaysia, that has been represented in the Sabah State Legislative Assembly. It is mandated to return a single member to the Assembly under the first-past-the-post voting system.

Polling districts 
As at 12 February 2016, this constituency contains the polling districts of Penimbawan, Serusup, Kindu, Indai, Batangan, Tambalang, Mengkabong, Berungis, Gayang, Nongkoulud, Telipok and Baru-Baru.

History

Election results

References 

Sabah state constituencies